Punk Rock is a play by the British playwright Simon Stephens which premiered at the Royal Exchange in 2009 and transferred to the Lyric Hammersmith directed by Sarah Frankcom. The play concerns a group of private school sixth formers during their A Level mocks exams.

Plot
In the library of a grammar school, eight sixth-formers are preparing for their mock-A Levels and nearing the end of their school lives. There are various sub-plots detailing the various love lines or triangles that emerge through the play.

Characters

Other productions
 Haptic Theatre Company performed the play in Dylan Thomas' Boathouse on 5 and 6 April 2013, directed by Elinor Richards. Bennet Francis was played by Oliver Selby and Chadwick Meade by Ollie Goulstone. 
 The Australian premiere was on 27 July 2012 performed by pantsguys Productions in association with the Australian Theatre for Young People
 From 3 to 18 August 2012 the play was performed at the Edinburgh Fringe by the No Prophet Theatre Company, starring Will Merrick as William Carlisle.
 A production of the play was done at the Oxford Playhouse.
 The New Zealand premiere was performed by The Outfit Theatre Company at The Basement Theatre in Auckland from 27 March to 7 April.
 From 14 to 16 March March 2012, a production of the play was performed at the Doncaster Little Theatre in Doncaster.
 The Welsh premiere of the play was performed at the Arad Goch theatre in Aberystwyth on 18 and 19 May 2012, directed by Rhodri Brady.
 Manchester School of Theatre produced the play in April 2012, directed by Chris Honer, starring Lucas Smith as William Carlisle.
 School theater DISK of Academy of Performing Arts in Prague produced the play from 3 April 2012, directed by Ivo Kristián Kubák.
 The New Wolsey Young Company performed the play from 3 to 7 December 2013. Tom Chamberlain played William Carlisle and Gemma Raw played Lilly Cahill.
The Western Australian Academy of Performing Arts produced this play in 2014 directed by Will O'Mahony
 The play made its New York premiere on 29 October 2014 in an MCC Theater production at the Lucille Lortel Theatre. The production, directed by Trip Cullman, was selected as a New York Times Critic's Pick, and earned Lucille Lortel Award nominations for Will Pullen (Outstanding Featured Actor in a Play, for his turn as Bennett Francis) and Japhy Weideman (Outstanding Lighting Design).
La Joven Compañía from Madrid produced the first Spanish production of Punk Rock directed by José Luis Arellano and adapted by José Luis Collado, opening on 11 November 2014 at Centro Cultural Conde Duque. This production was listed as candidate for Premios MAX 2015 as Best Outstanding Production.
The Nottingham New Theatre produced a production in their 2014 Autumn Season, directed by Bridie Rollins and Lara Tysseling.
 The play made its Edinburgh Fringe return on 24 August 2015 by Theatre Company 'The Pigeon Collective'. The production received a five star review from 'Broadway Baby' and made it into the Top Rated Shows of 2015 at Edinburgh Fringe Punk Rock by Simon Stephens: 5 star review by Bennett Bonci
 The Fortune Theatre (Dunedin, New Zealand) produced this play, opening 27 June 2015, directed by Lara Macgregor.
 Beautiful City Theatre put on a production of this play in Montreal at The Centaur from 5–14 May 2016, directed by Calli Armstrong.
 The French company Summer Lemonade produced punk rock at Avignon festival in 2019, directed by Marc Derville. It was the first time a Simon Stephens play was produced in Avignon. They received critical acclaim for their production
 Patalog Theatre Co. premiered the play in Melbourne for the first time professionally at fortyfivedownstairs in December 2019. The play received wide critical acclaim with critics calling it "A masterful re-working. Unmissable.".

Reception
The premiere received generally positive reviews with Variety saying "confirms Simon Stephens as one of the most important and exciting British playwrights working today". The play has also been nominated for the 2010 TMA Best New Play award. It was also well received by The Guardian, the Crikey blog, The Times and others.

Some critics have criticised Stephens for unoriginality, however. For example, Leo Benedictus, writing for the guardian in 2009, said "The critics spot various possible influences such as The History Boys, Another Country, Lord of the Flies, Elephant, If…, Skins, and The Catcher in the Rye."

Legacy

Identity Crisis
Punk Rock inspired Identity Crisis, a drama and philosophy project, exploring the play's themes with young people in London and Manchester.

Teaching
Punk Rock is frequently used in Drama education in sixth form and sometimes at GCSE level in England, as well as a few other places around the world. There have been multiple student productions of the play, some of which the play's author, Simon Stephens, has attended.

References

External links 
 Punk Rock Interactive Site
 Punk Rock at The Royal Exchange Theatre

2009 plays
English plays
Manchester in fiction
Plays set in England